Sir Cecil Fane de Salis, (31 May 1857 – 9 March 1948) was chairman of Middlesex County Council 1919–1924, and landowner in the parish of Harlington.

Biography
Second of four sons of Rev. Henry Jerome Fane De Salis of Portnall Park, he was educated at Eton and Christ Church, Oxford.  He was called to the Bar from the Inner Temple in 1881

In March 1899 he was elected unopposed to Middlesex County Council to represent Stanwell. He was re-elected three times before unexpectedly losing his seat at the 1910 county council election. He was able to remain a member of the council when he chosen as a county alderman a few days later. He was Chairman of Middlesex County Council from 1919-24. In 1937 he retired from the county council when he did not seek re-election as an alderman.

Chairman and owner of market gardeners H. & A. Pullen Burry, Ltd. of Sompting, West Sussex; he was a director of the Dawley Wall Gravel Pit in the parish of Harlington; JP (Middlesex, 1896–1938), chairman of the bench 1921–1931; Deputy Lieutenant (Middlesex, from 1918); High Sheriff (Middlesex, 1905). In 1931 he became a companion of the Order of the Bath (CB) and was made a knight (KCB) of the same order in 1935.

During the First World War he sat for 449 days (from 25 February 1916) as one of the ten members of the Appeal Tribunal for the County of Middlesex, which he described: "This was sad work and many hard cases had to be dealt with, and often decided against the appellant". He was vice-chairman (1912–1925) and then chairman (1925–1936) of the Middlesex Territorial and Auxiliary Force Association.
Through Middlesex County Council he was closely associated with the mental hospitals at Harperbury and Shenley. He was also a governor of Uxbridge County School, aka the Bishopshalt School, now in Hillingdon. He was a member of the Union Club (site now home to Canada House, Trafalgar Square).

The Belfast Gazette of 11 March 1927, records Cecil as having 18 parcels of land in county Armagh. These were at Dromart, Tandragee; Ballyworkan, Portadown; Tamnaghvelton; Tamnaghmore; and Brackagh, Portadown. These came to circa 140 acres and were valued at and compulsorily sold to the tenants for circa £2,000 in 1927.

Family
He married, on 3 September 1889, Rachel Elizabeth Frances Waller, (born 1 January 1868; died 6 January 1954), only child and heir of Edmund Waller VI or VII, and had 14 children (9 sons, 5 daughters), living firstly, 1889–1896, with his father at Portnall Park and then at Dawley Court.
t

Notes

References

1857 births
1948 deaths
High Sheriffs of Middlesex
Deputy Lieutenants of Middlesex
People educated at Eton College
Alumni of Christ Church, Oxford
British people of Swiss descent
Cecil
People from Hillingdon
People from Cherwell District
Cecil
Members of Middlesex County Council